Julie Coin and Emily Webley-Smith were the defending champions, but Coin retired from professional tennis at the end of 2015. Webley-Smith partnered Riko Sawayanagi, but they lost in the first round.

Wildcards Catherine Bellis and Ingrid Neel won the title, defeating Naomi Broady and Shelby Rogers in the final, 6–2, 6–4.

Seeds

Draw

External links
 Draw

Dow Corning Tennis Classic - Doubles
Dow Corning Tennis Classic